Amaya may refer to:

People
 Amaya (Spanish-language name) lists people with the Spanish given name, Amaya
 Amaya (surname) lists people with the Japanese and Spanish surname, Amaya
 Maja Keuc (born 1992), Slovenian singer known as Amaya

Places
 Amaya (Burgos), a small village in Spain
 Amaya Creek, Santa Cruz County, California
 Amaya Station, Aizuwakamatsu, Fukushima Prefecture, Japan
 Amaya (woreda), a district in the Oromia Region of Ethiopia

The arts
 Amaya o los vascos en el siglo VIII, a novel by Francisco Navarro-Villoslada
 Amaya (TV series), a period drama set in pre-Hispanic Philippines
 Hong Kong Confidential (2010 film), also known as Amaya

Other uses
 Amaya (orca) (born 2014), a captive killer whale at SeaWorld San Diego 
 Amaya (web editor), a WYSIWYG web authoring tool by the W3C
 Amaya Inc., an online gaming company
 Amaya Resorts & Spas, a Sri Lankan hospitality brand

See also
 Amya (disambiguation)